The TREX (TRanscription-EXport) complex is a conserved eukaryotic multi-protein complex that couples mRNA transcription and nuclear export. The TREX complex travels across transcribed genes with RNA polymerase II. TREX binds mRNA and recruits transport proteins NXF1 and NXT1 (yeast Mex67 and Mtr2), which shuttle the mRNA out of the nucleus.  The TREX complex plays an important role in genome stability and neurodegenerative diseases.

Role in mRNA nuclear export 

During transcription elongation, the THO complex follows RNA polymerase II and interacts with transcription factors along the entire transcribed region. Then, the carboxy-terminal domain (CTD) of RNA polymerase II recruits the 3'-end processing factors/transcription termination factors, which load DEAD-box RNA helicase UAP56 and RNA export adapter ALYREF. This forms the complete TREX complex. At the end of transcription, after the 3'-end of mRNA is formed and the mRNA is released from transcription site, the mRNA is transferred from UAP56 to ALYREF. UAP56 then dissociates, allowing the heterodimeric export receptor NXF1-NXT1 to bind as it recognizes the mRNA indirectly through ALYREF. Further arrangements of mRNA result in ALYREF's release. Finally, the NXF1-NXT1 dimer facilitates mRNA nuclear transport to the cytoplasm through direct interaction with the nuclear pore complex.

Composition and conservation in eukaryotic species

THO complex 

The human THO complex comprises six subunits, THOC1, −2, –3, −5, –6, and −7. Four of them have counterparts in Saccharomyces cerevisiae: THOC1 (yeast Hpr1), −2 (yeast Tho2), −3 (yeast Tex3), and −7 (yeast Mft1). THOC1 is the first protein identified in THO complex. THOC2 is the largest subunit of TREX. It acts as a scaffold for the formation of the complex. The C-terminal domain of THOC2 directly interacts with nucleic acids. Mutational variants of THOC2 have been associated with syndromic intellectual disabilities, causing seizures, tremors, speech delays, and more. THOC 3 and 6 both contains WD40 repeat motifs that allow interaction with other THO proteins. THOC5 and THOC7 binds tightly and forms a dimer at their coiled coil domain (CCD). Four THO complexes form a tetramer, and each THO complex binds with one UAP56 protein at THOC2 and THOC1.

DDX39/UAP56 
DDX39, or U2AF65-associated protein 56 (UAP56, Sub2 in yeast) is a DEAD-box ATPase essential for pre-mRNA splicing, but is also a key component of the TREX complex. DDX39 is very similar to UAP56, sharing 90% of the amino acid sequence. UAP56 travels along genes with the THO complex, where it interacts with the sugar-phosphate backbone of the mRNA. UAP56 functions to recruit ALYREF, an RNA export adaptor, to the spliced or intronless mRNA. After transfer of the mRNA from UAP56 to ALYREF, UAP56 dissociates from the complex, allowing the binding of export factor NXF1 to ALYREF at the same site.

DDX39a 
In mammalian cells, a paralog of DDX39b, DDX39a, exists, and is somewhat functionally redundant. Knockdown of both paralogs is required to block mRNA export, but depletion of either paralog affects different forms of mRNAs. DDX39b is shown to associate with THO and ALYREF, and DDX39a with CIP29 and ALYREF.

ALYREF 
ALYREF (Yra1 in yeast) is an essential RNA export adapter involved in the export of both spliced and intronless mRNAs. The N and C-termini of ALYREF both contain UAP56-bonding motifs (UBMs), which are necessary for its interaction with UAP56. ALYREF also contains an RNA recognition motif (RRM) that weakly binds RNA, and is flanked by two arginine-rich RNA binding sites. ALYREF alone cannot bind mRNA effectively, and requires interaction with UAP56 to bind the mRNA in the TREX Complex (see Figure 3). These arginine-rich sites are also necessary for ALYREF's interaction with export receptor NXF1, which stimulates the transfer of the mRNA from ALYREF to NXF1. Like UAP56, ALYREF dissociates prior to nuclear export of the mRNA. The unstructured and flexible nature of ALYREF indicates it may play a key role in packaging the mRNA and proteins into a messenger ribonuclear protein (mRNP) for nuclear export.

UIF/FYTTD1 
UIF, identified through gene homology of ALYREF's UAP56-binding domain, is functionally redundant with ALYREF. Knockdown of ALYREF in mammalian cells results in large upregulation of UIF. UIF can associate with the other TREX complex components in an RNA-independent manner. UIF is speculated to associate with alternative TREX complexes in place of ALYREF, perhaps acting on certain types or mRNAs.

CHTOP 
Originally identified as a RNA-binding protein involved in cell cycle regulation, CHTOP contains two UBMs like those in ALYREF and UIF, and is thought to function in a similar manner to ALYREF. CHTOP has also been show to stimulate UAP56 ATPase activity. CHTOP is speculated to associate with alternative TREX complexes in place of UAP56, perhaps acting on specific types or mRNAs.

SARNP/CIP29 
SARNP/CIP29 (yeast Tho1), identified alongside yeast Tho2, forms a trimeric complex with UAP56 and ALYREF, and has been shown to preferentially associate with DDX39a. SARNP stimulates UAP56 ATPase activity.

Associated proteins

NXF1 
NXF1(Mex67p in yeast), also known as nuclear RNA export factor 1, is a multi-domain protein composed of one conserved N-terminal RNA recognition and four leucine-rich repeat motifs, a central NTF2-like domain, and a C-terminal ubiquitin associated domain that mediates interactions with nucleoporins. The NTF2-like domain is able to form heterodimers with NTF2-related export protein-1 (NXT1). The heterodimer binds mRNAs processed by the TREX complex and assists the TREX complex in the nuclear export process.

NXT1 
NXT1 (Mtr2p in yeast) is also known as p15. It shuttles between the nucleus and the cytoplasm acting as an active nuclear transport protein. NXT1 binds specifically to Ran-GTP and localizes to the nuclear pore complex in mammalian cells. It also stabilizes and forms heterodimers with NXF1. The heterodimer binds mRNAs processed by the TREX complex and assists the TREX complex in the nuclear export process.

NCBP1 & NCBP3 
NCBP1 and NCBP3 are both part of the cap-binding complex. The two proteins interact with each other as well as the TREX complex in facilitating the mRNA export from the nucleus to the cytoplasm. NCBP3 further interact with exon junction complex proteins for mRNA splicing and stability.

Role in genome stability, mutations, and diseases 
The TREX complex is a conserved protein complex that couples transcription to mRNA export and is linked to genome stability and several disorders.

Genome stability 
The TREX complex plays an important role in genome stability. Newly formed RNA strands can hybridize with the single-stranded template DNA sequence during transcription, leading to an R-loop. The R-loop makes the opposing DNA strand more susceptible to cleavage, which can cause DNA damage in cells.  The TREX complex associates with the RNA polymerase and newly formed RNA, sequestering the RNA and, therefore, preventing its hybridization to the DNA strand, improving genome stability.

Neurodegenerative diseases 
The TREX complex is associated with several neurodegenerative and neurodevelopmental disorders.  These disorders are caused by mutations in the TREX complex itself or in other genes.

Direct mutations in TREX subunits 
Several mutations in the THOC2 gene, part of the THO complex, are associated with disease. For example, missense mutations, or a change in a nucleotide that results in the encoding of a different amino acid, in this gene and translocations on the X chromosome are associated with intellectual disabilities.

The THOC6 gene, part of the THO complex, plays a role in the development of the brain and other organs.  Mutations on this gene leads to the incorrect localization of the protein in the cytoplasm, an essential process for neural and organ development. A homozygous mutation in this gene can lead to not only intellectual disability, but cardiac defects and brain malformation.

Mutations in other genes 
Mutations in other genes can also have an indirect dependence on the TREX complex and lead to disease, including familial amyotrophic lateral sclerosis(ALS). ALS is a rare neurodegenerative disease that leads to the death of motor neurons in the brain, resulting in the loss of voluntary movement. In the familial form of the disease, a GGGGCC repeat in an intron of the C9ORF72 gene is expanded in the pre-mRNA, which is exported to the cytoplasm and forms RNA foci. ALYREF binds to the repeat expansion, and an excess recruitment promotes its export. A mutation that disrupts its activity suppresses neurodegeneration, and is enhanced by CHTOP and NXF1.

See also 
 THOC1
 THOC2
 THOC5
 BAT1
 DDX39
 ALYREF
 SARNP
 NXT1
 NXF1

References